Greatest Hits (of Other People) is the second album by Australian rock band The Party Boys. It was recorded live during a tour in 1983.

Track listing
I'm a Rocker
I Fought the Law
Highway Chile
Runaway
Sweet Emotion
Sugar Shack
Stealer
Street Fighting Man
Mercury Blues
Rainy Day Woman No's 12 & 35

Credits
 Richard Clapton – vocals
 Kevin Borich – guitar, vocals track 3
 Paul Christie – bass, drums track 6, harmonica, vocals
 Graham Bidstrup – drums, bass track 6, vocals
 Harvey James – guitar, bass track 10, vocals
 Don Raffaele – saxophone
 Mixed by Mark Opitz

References

1983 live albums
The Party Boys albums